Nicholas Browne (1947–2014) was a British diplomat.

Nicholas Browne may also refer to:

Nick Browne (American football) (born 1980), former American football placekicker
Nick Browne (cricketer) (born 1991), English cricketer

See also
Nicholas Brown (disambiguation)